Heteroplacidium is a genus of lichen-forming fungi in the family Verrucariaceae. The genus was circumscribed by Austrian lichenologist Othmar Breuss in 1996 with Heteroplacidium imbricatum assigned as the type species. It was proposed as a segregate of Catapyrenium. Other morphologically similar genera are Neocatapyrenium, Placidium, and Scleropyrenium, although molecular phylogenetic analyses indicate that they are independent monophyletic lineages within the Verrucariaceae.

Most Heteroplacidium species are autonomous lichens, generally crustose and areolate. Four species in the genus are obligate parasites or facultatively lichenicolous – H. compactum, H. fusculum, H. transmutans, and H. zamenhofianum.

Species
Heteroplacidium acarosporoides 
Heteroplacidium acervatum 
Heteroplacidium compactum 
Heteroplacidium congestum 
Heteroplacidium contumescens 
Heteroplacidium divisum 
Heteroplacidium endocarpoides 
Heteroplacidium fusculum 
Heteroplacidium imbricatum 
Heteroplacidium phaeocarpoides 
Heteroplacidium podolepis 
Heteroplacidium transmutans 
Heteroplacidium zamenhofianum

References

Verrucariales
Eurotiomycetes genera
Lichen genera
Taxa described in 1996